The Vorderrhein (German, ; English: Anterior Rhine;; Sutsilvan: Ragn Anteriur; Rumantsch Grischun, Vallader, and Puter: Rain Anteriur; Surmiran: Ragn anteriour) is one of the two sources of the Rhine. According to the Atlas of Switzerland of the Swiss Federal Office of Topography, the source of the Vorderrhein—and thus of the Rhine—is located north of the Rein da Tuma and Lake Toma.

Vorderrhein was also the name of a judicial district that was created in 1851 with the reorganization of the judiciary of Graubünden. In 2001, it was annexed by the District Surselva.

The largest communities along the Vorderrhein are Disentis and Ilanz.

Course 

The Vorderrhein flows mostly in an east-northeast direction, through the Surselva, a large longitudinal valley.  Its north side is steep, with short valleys, the southern side, however, is divided by some long valleys (similar to the situation in the canton of Valais further west).  Consequently, its main tributaries, the Rein da Sumvitg, the Glenner and the Rabiusa all come from the south.  In its lower course the Vorderrhein flows through the Flims Rockslide, giving rise to the canyon country of the Ruinaulta.  Near Reichenau, it joins the Hinterrhein to form the (Alpine) Rhine.

Headwaters 
Some of the tributaries of the Vorderrhein are almost as long as the main branch.  In downstream order, they are (measuring their length from their respective sources to the confluence with Hinterrhein at Reichenau):

 Two unnamed streams originating in the Puozas and Milez areas near the Oberalppass
 Rein da Tuma, including the Lai da Tuma and the main head of the lake, about 
 The Aua da Val from the Val valley (70 km)
 Rein da Maighels (75 km) (tributary of the Rein da Curnera)
 Rein da Curnera (about 74 km)
 Rein da Nalps (about 71 km)
 Rein da Medel, the upper reaches in the canton of Ticino are known as Reno di Medel, and also as Froda (about 76 km)

So the longer arms are not the source at Oberalppass, but further southeast.  The longest headwater front of the Vorderrhein (and thus the Rhine as a whole, see sources of the Rhine), is the Reno di Medel, which rises on the border of the municipality Quinto in Ticino.  In the uppermost part of its course, it runs in the Val Cadlimo, south of the geomorphological main Alpine ridge, west of the Lukmanier Pass.

It starts with the creek Aua da Russein (lit.: "Water of the Russein").

Tourism 

Thanks to its attractive scenery and some interesting passage, the Vorderrhein is a popular river for paddling and rafting, especially the section between Ilanz and Versam.

Along entire length of the Vorderrhein there is a narrow-gauge railway line: from Chur to Disentis there is a line of the Rhätische Bahn. From Disentis, the Furka-Oberalp line of the Matterhorn Gotthard Bahn runs to the Oberalp Pass and on to Andermatt.

The Senda Sursilvana, a hiking trail along the young Rhine River lead from the Oberalp Pass along the Vorderrhein in the direction of Chur.

Footnotes

External links 
 Natural Monument Ruinaulta
 flow description for water rides

Rhine